Lathosterol is a cholesterol-like molecule found small amounts in humans.  Sterol-C5-desaturase-like acts upon it.  It is accumulated in lathosterolosis.

See also
 Lathosterol oxidase

References

Cholestanes
Sterols